A formal minor-planet designation is, in its final form, a number–name combination given to a minor planet (asteroid, centaur, trans-Neptunian object and dwarf planet but not comet). Such designation always features a leading number (catalog or IAU number) assigned to a body once its orbital path is sufficiently secured (so-called "numbering"). The formal designation is based on the minor planet's provisional designation, which was previously assigned automatically when it had been observed for the first time. Later on, the provisional part of the formal designation may be replaced with a name (so-called "naming"). Both formal and provisional designations are overseen by the Minor Planet Center (MPC), a branch of the International Astronomical Union.

Currently, a number is assigned only after the orbit has been secured by four well-observed oppositions. For unusual objects, such as near-Earth asteroids, numbering might already occur after three, maybe even only two, oppositions. Among more than half a million minor planets that received a number, only about 20 thousand (or 4%) have received a name. In addition, approximately 500,000 minor planets have not even been numbered.(as of 2020).

The convention for satellites of minor planets, such as the formal designation (87) Sylvia I Romulus for the asteroid moon Romulus, is an extension of the Roman numeral convention that had been used, on and off, for the moons of the planets since Galileo's time. Comets are also managed by the MPC, but use a different cataloguing system.

Syntax 

A formal designation consists of two parts: a catalog number, historically assigned in approximate order of discovery, and either a name, typically assigned by the discoverer, or, the minor planet's provisional designation.

The permanent syntax is:
 for unnamed minor planets: (number) Provisional designation
 for named minor planets: (number) Name; with or without parentheses

For example, the unnamed minor planet  has its number always written in parentheses, while for named minor planets such as (274301) Wikipedia, the parentheses may be dropped as in 274301 Wikipedia. Parentheses are now often omitted in prominent databases such as the JPL Small-Body Database.

Since minor-planet designations change over time, different versions may be used in astronomy journals. On 27 January 2013, it was named Wikipedia after being published in the Minor Planet Circulars.

In practice, for any reasonably well-known object the number is mostly a catalogue entry, and the name or provisional designation is generally used in place of the formal designation.

History 

By 1851 there were 15 known asteroids, all but one with their own symbol. The symbols grew increasingly complex as the number of objects grew, and, as they had to be drawn by hand, astronomers found some of them difficult. This difficulty was addressed by Benjamin Apthorp Gould in 1851, who suggested numbering asteroids in their order of discovery, and placing this number in a circle as the symbol for the asteroid, such as ④ for the fourth asteroid, Vesta. This practice was soon coupled with the name itself into an official number–name designation, "④ Vesta", as the number of minor planets increased. By the late 1850s, the circle had been simplified to parentheses, "(4)" and "(4) Vesta", which was easier to typeset. Other punctuation such as "4) Vesta" and "4, Vesta" was also used, but had more or less completely died out by 1949.

The major exception to the convention that the number tracks the order of discovery or determination of orbit is the case of Pluto. Since Pluto was initially classified as a planet, it was not given a number until a 2006 redefinition of "planet" that excluded it. At that point, Pluto was given the formal designation (134340) Pluto.

See also 
 List of minor planets, see index
 Astronomical naming conventions
 Meanings of minor-planet names
 Name conflicts with minor planets

References

External links 
 IAU FAQ on minor planets
 MPC explanation of provisional designations
 Dr. James Hilton, When Did the Asteroids Become Minor Planets?

Minor planets
Astronomical nomenclature